Lilly is a borough in Cambria County, Pennsylvania, United States. It is part of the Johnstown, Pennsylvania Metropolitan Statistical Area. The population was 968 at the 2010 census.

History
The Lilly Bridge was listed on the National Register of Historic Places in 1988.

Geography
Lilly is located in eastern Cambria County at  (40.425000, -78.620434), in the valley of the Little Conemaugh River near its headwaters. Pennsylvania Route 53 passes through the borough, leading north  to U.S. Route 22 near Cresson.

Demographics

As of the census of 2000, there were 948 people, 407 households, and 269 families residing in the borough. The racial makeup of the borough was 99.47% White, 0.21% Native American, 0.11% Asian, 0.11% Pacific Islander, and 0.11% from two or more races.

There were 407 households, out of which 23.3% had children under the age of 18 living with them, 49.1% were married couples living together, 12.8% had a female householder with no husband present, and 33.9% were non-families. 31.9% of all households were made up of individuals, and 17.7% had someone living alone who was 65 years of age or older. The average household size was 2.32 and the average family size was 2.91.

In the borough the population was spread out, with 18.8% under the age of 18, 7.4% from 18 to 24, 26.2% from 25 to 44, 26.8% from 45 to 64, and 20.9% who were 65 years of age or older. The median age was 44 years. For every 100 females there were 88.8 males. For every 100 females age 18 and over, there were 89.7 males.

The median income for a household in the borough was $27,917, and the median income for a family was $38,750. Males had a median income of $29,063 versus $18,929 for females. The per capita income for the borough was $15,984. About 3.8% of families and 7.8% of the population were below the poverty line, including 3.4% of those under age 18 and 12.7% of those age 65 or over.

Central Mainline Sewer Authority
Sewage treatment in Lilly is provided by the Central Mainline Sewer Authority. A dedication ceremony was held on August 21, 2006, by local congressman John Murtha. Total costs of the system was $10 million, and construction took 14 years. Central Mainline serves over 2,000 customers.

References

External links
Washington Township/Central Mainline Sewer Authority

Populated places established in 1806
Boroughs in Cambria County, Pennsylvania